Wheathill is a village and civil parish  south east of Shrewsbury, in the Shropshire district, in the ceremonial county of Shropshire, England. The parish includes the villages of Loughton and Silvington, the hamlet of Bromdon and the deserted village of Egerton. In 2011 the parish had a population of 229. The parish touches Aston Botterell, Bitterley, Burwarton, Clee St. Margaret, Farlow, Hopton Wafers and Stoke St. Milborough.

Landmarks 
There are 14 listed buildings in Wheathill. Wheathill has a church called Holy Trinity.

History 
The name "Wheathill" means 'Wheat hill'. Wheathill was recorded in the Domesday Book as Waltham. On 1 April 1967 Loughton and Silvington parishes were merged with Wheathill.

References

External links 
 Parish council

Villages in Shropshire
Civil parishes in Shropshire